Vladimirea ivinskisi is a moth in the family Gelechiidae. It was described by Piskunov in 1980. It is found in Mongolia.

References

Vladimirea
Moths described in 1980